Antoine Michael Garibaldi is the 25th and first lay president of the University of Detroit Mercy in Detroit, Michigan. He is also the school's first African-American president, and was appointed to the role in June 2011. He announced his retirement in August 2021, to go into effect the following June.

Early life and education 
Garibaldi is a graduate of the middle school at St. Augustine High School in New Orleans, Louisiana, his hometown, Epiphany Apostolic College in Newburgh, New York and Howard University in Washington DC. He later obtained his PhD from the University of Minnesota.

Personal life 
Garibaldi is a Catholic, and was formerly a seminarian with the Josephites.

References

Presidents of the University of Detroit Mercy
African-American Catholics
People from New Orleans
University of Detroit Mercy
Howard University alumni
University of Minnesota alumni
1950 births
Living people
Society of St. Joseph of the Sacred Heart
Epiphany Apostolic College